Mark VI served as Greek Patriarch of Alexandria between 1459 and 1484.

References

15th-century Patriarchs of Alexandria